Conservation and restoration of metals is the activity devoted to the protection and preservation of historical (religious, artistic, technical and ethnographic) and archaeological objects made partly or entirely of metal. In it are included all activities aimed at preventing or slowing deterioration of items, as well as improving accessibility and readability of the objects of cultural heritage. Despite the fact that metals are generally considered as relatively permanent and stable materials, in contact with the environment they deteriorate gradually, some faster and some much slower. This applies especially to archaeological finds.

Metals and the agents of deterioration

An essential cause of deterioration is corrosion of metal objects or object deterioration by interaction with the environment. As the most influential factors of deterioration of historical objects should be pointed out as the relative humidity and air pollution while in archaeological objects a crucial role has composition, depth, humidity and amount of gasses in the soil. In cases of marine or fresh water finds the most important factors of decay are the amount and composition of soluble salts, water depth, amount of dissolved gases, the direction of water currents and the role of both microscopic and macroscopic living organisms.
Deterioration of materials associated with metals
Associated materials deteriorate depending on the origin whether they are organic or inorganic materials. Organic materials usually fail in a relatively short period of time, primarily due to biodegradation. With inorganic materials are these processes considerably longer and more complex. Amount of gases, humidity, depth and composition of soil are very important. In case of salty and sweet water finds essential are amount of gases dissolved in water, depth of water, direction of currents, and microscopic and macroscopic living organisms.

Agents of Deterioration

Physical Force 
Physical force is one of the most common means of damage to metal objects, which “are considered to be strong and resilient though exhibit weakness and brittleness under certain conditions.”  This includes breakage, dents, and scratches which occur in accidents, improper storage and mounting, mishandling, and over-polishing.

Fire 
Low melting point alloys, such as pewter or lead-tin, are at risk of damage due to fire, though other metals are not at risk from the fire itself, but the pollutants caused by smoke.

Water 
Contact with water, or a complete immersion in water, will lead to some degree of corrosion. The more oxygenated the water is, or the higher quantity of salt present in the water, will cause a more rapid and aggressive corrosion to metal. Short term exposure to water "can result in rapid surface corrosion, such as when flash rusting occurs on iron or steel objects that have been even momentarily wetted." Iron and steel are most affected by water.

Pollutants 
Atmospheric pollutants are one of the more common agents of deterioration for metals, with tin and tin alloys most affected and resulting in corrosion. Most common pollutants include dirt, soot, dust, and chemicals. Fingerprints, salts, fatty acids, and polish residues can also cause corrosion.

Incorrect Temperature and Relative Humidity 
Higher temperatures increase the rate of chemical reactions and corrosion. Temperature also affects relative humidity, thus should be monitored and controlled. The higher the relative humidity (65% and above), the higher the risk of corrosion. Lead is the least affected by high humidity.

Metals conservation planning
As with the conservation and restoration works on any other material,  here are the basic tenets of conservation-restoration based on the quality of execution and the best possible preservation of cultural, historical and technological identity and integrity of objects. Minimal intervention, reversibility and repeatability of preferred treatment are essential, as well as the possibility of easy identification of restored parts. Recently, the non-toxic nature of materials and procedures used in conservation has become important too, both in relation to objects and conservator-restorer as a performer, but also in relation to the environment.

Research 

Nowadays, scientific research is an integral part of conservation treatment of metals, in which different scientific methods and techniques help in determining what should be done in the preservation and care of the object. Conservators investigate the materials and techniques used in the creation of an object to better understand and diagnose an object's condition and make plans for effective treatment.   

Identification of metals and alloys

Simple methods - visual examination, spot tests, specific gravity
Scientific methods - X-ray fluorescence, X-ray Diffraction (XRD), Particle-induced X-ray emission, LIBS, SEM, electrochemical techniques, metallography

Identification of corrosion processes and products
Simple method - visual examination, spot tests
The Oddy test - for copper, silver, and lead
Scientific methods - X-ray Diffraction, SEM, metallography

Identification of materials associated with metals
Simple methods - visual examination, spot tests, specific gravity
Scientific methods - X-ray fluorescence, chromatography, Raman spectroscopy

Identification of technology used to produce objects
Simple methods - visual examination
Scientific methods - metallography, x-ray radiography, x-ray computed tomography

Decision making 
In preparing the strategy of a metals conservation project, an interdisciplinary approach is essential. This implies the participation and close collaboration between as many experts as is possible. At minimum, the curator (archaeologist, historian, or art historian), a scientist specialized in the corrosion of metallic objects of cultural heritage, and the conservator or restorer should be involved in the project.

Documentation 
Systematic and well-managed documentation is an essential prerequisite for quality conservation and restoration treatment as "it is no longer considered acceptable to undertake a conservation treatment without recording the object and the intervention." Conservation documentation should include the state of the object's condition before, during, and after treatment. Any technique used to assess the object's condition should be documented as well. Conservation "documentation can also be viewed as a 'surrogate object', and can therefore form part of preventive conservation strategies intended to enhance access to information while reducing the handling of objects." Although documentation requirements differ across institutions, most records follow the same general format, including:

Object data, such as location, ownership, and accession records
Progress data, such as the date the object was received for treatment and when treatment is completed
Technical data, such as examination results and analysis
Object condition and treatment data, including materials and equipment used in treatment
Recommendations, such as advice for storage and display or reexamination and further care of the object
References, photographs, and diagrams

Ethics and ethical problems in metals conservation 
The ethical concept of conservation of metal objects in principle is the same as those in other fields of conservation-restoration of cultural heritage.

However, there are several specific problems that can only be found in the conservation of metals; problems of heat treatment of archaeological objects, and the problem of radical restoration of historic, technical, and architectonic objects too.

While the first case problem is primarily in the destruction of valuable scientific data, the problems in the case of technical, architectural, and historical objects are that radically restored items only simulate the original appearance of the object, thus that object can be considered more or less fake, which only superficially simulate long-lost or the never existing state of an object. Whenever possible the preservation of real historical substance is preferred.

Ethical problems connected with conservation of sacred metallic heritage objects can be included too.

Preventive conservation

Preventive conservation, also known as collections care or risk management, encompasses all actions taken to prolong the life of an object." and is an important element of museum policy. Members of the museum profession are entrusted to create and maintain a protective environment for the collections in their care. A good preventive conservation program minimizes the need for conservation treatment by blocking, avoiding, or minimizing the agents of deterioration. Emergency planning, environmental safeguards and monitoring are all types of preventive conservation. Scientific research continues to discover new ways of safeguarding collections. Today various monitoring devices assist in the observation of changes in the Agents of Deterioration and other changes that may assist in diagnosing destructive activity before it is a disaster. In the image to the right a device is being attached to the Liberty Bell to monitor any changes in the crack. Metallic heritage objects are sensitive to environmental conditions such as exposure to light and ultraviolet light, temperature, relative humidity, water and moisture, and various pollutants especially chloride salts. Safeguards of protection against threats of natural disasters such as flood or fire need to be planned for and maintaining an environment that keep all Agents of Deterioration within safe limits and controlling their fluctuation will assist in the preservation of metals.  

Whether in storage, on display, or in transit metals are best preserved in a "moderate climate that avoids extreme temperature and RH fluctuations and that excludes daylight and/or filters out ultraviolet light and infrared radiation and air pollution provides the appropriate environment for collection preservation." 
A controlled environment can protect metals from polluted air, dust, ultraviolet radiation, and excessive relative humidity - ideal values are temperature of 16-20 °C and up to 40% (35-55% according to recent Canadian Conservation Institute recommendations) relative humidity, noting that if metal is combined with organic materials, relative humidity should not be below 45%. Archaeological objects are best stored in rooms (or plastic boxes) with very low relative humidity, except if they come from a bog or high water environment, in which case the right equilibrium with the environment needs to be found. Particularly valuable items can be placed in sealed micro-climate containers with an inert gas such as nitrogen or argon. Metals with active corrosion fare better with lower relative humidity: copper or copper alloy objects up to 35% RH and iron objects 12-15% RH. 

Clean and well organized storage areas are important but materials in the environment are also considered. Wood and wood-based products (Particle board, plywood) can off-gas and cause metals to deteriorate. Shelves in the storerooms are best when made of stainless steel or chlorine and acetate free plastic or powder coated steel. Metals can be damaged by the use of rubber, felt, wool or the oil on our skin, so it is recommended to wear cotton gloves when handling metal objects. Other materials stored with or a part of a metal object, may impact or be impacted by the environment. Organic materials for instance may hold moisture or be more susceptible to deterioration than metals. This could impact the metals' stability.   

Lighting levels for metal preservation is best kept below 300 lux (up to 150 lux in case of lacquered or painted objects, up to 50 lux in case of objects with light sensitive materials) There are many lighting options available, including LED lights and filters that block harmful ultraviolet rays.   

Monitoring the condition of the metals assists in determining when and if other conservation measures are needed including restorative conservation work and/or the services of a qualified conservator. Whether written, drawn or photographed, documentation of a metal object will record changes of the object over time. This allows slow deterioration that may go unnoticed to be recognized and alleviated.

Interventive conservation

Interventive conservation or treatment is an intrusion and a deliberate attempt to alter the physical and/or chemical aspects of an object in an attempt to preserve and/or restore object. "In accordance with NPS Management Policies, conservation treatments are done as a last resort, kept to a minimum, and should be reversible." One of the main proponents of the ethics of conservation is to do nothing. Preserving the original materials and minimizing invasive treatments reduces "the chances of compromising the aesthetic, archaeological, cultural, historical, physical, religious, or scientific integrity of objects." Interventive treatments are needed when an object is disintegrating or fragile and the treatment will protect the object and/or stop the decay. Also the restoration of an object for visual display and presentation is also a possibility which may need pre-thought with discussions and negotiations with the parties involved. Planning will assist in making the best decision in a restorative, interventive treatment for the object and the situation. Similar to many other bronze statues, the statue of Joseph of Portugal had an interventive conservation treatment. The conservation decision made to remove the patina most likely happened for two reasons. Firstly, it improves the visual impression of the statue; and secondly, the patina is a corrosive process slowly destroying the metal.

Metal conservator training

Notable metal conservators and organizations

There are many nameless people associated with metal conservation.

prior to 1800
Ancient civilizations used seven metals: Iron, Tin, Lead, Copper, Mercury, Silver, and Gold as objects of adornment, religious artifacts, and weaponry. Metals were important, and protective conservation measures taken as a copper pendant from northern Iraq dating 8,700 BCE and the 4450 BCE gold artifacts from Bulgarian Varna Necropolis were most likely polished and valued as precious metal.
 The Roman bronze monument of Marcus Aurelius, has several signs of conservation restorations taking place since its construction in approximately 176 C.E..

1800s and early 1900s
Prior to the late 1800s treatments consisted of reconstruction and repair by craftsmen, familiar with the object materials and corrosion was thought to be a type of bacteria. In the late 1800s, scientists began looking into understanding the causes of deterioration and corrosion. In 1888: Flinders Petrie (1853-1942) published an article on the excavation and conservation of small objects and German chemist, Friedrich Rathgen, (1862-1942), became not only the first director of the Chemical Laboratory of the Royal Museums of Berlin but the first scientist employed in a museum laboratory. Rathgen utilized electrolytic reduction to remove the corrosive patina on the Egyptian bronze Collection at the Royal Museum to eliminate chloride salts. At the turn of the century French chemist, Marcellin Berthelot(1827-1907), presented several papers before the French Academy of Sciences stating the deterioration of bronze and silver artifacts were due to a cyclic process of corrosive chloride salts. Rathgen continued scientific research on Bronze disease to understand the chemical conversion of the metal due to the presence of moisture. Rathgen applied a scientific method to museum artifact preservation and by continuing to research, develop, apply and publish his findings on his physical and chemical methods and formulating guidelines for application, he became a principle force in the standard's acceptance. He is considered the founder of modern chemical conservation science, writing the first fully comprehensive treatment handbook of conservation to be published. Die Konservierung von Altertumsfun- den [The Conservation of Antiquities] was first published in 1898, translated to English in 1905, and is still in print.

Mid 1900s

During World War I (WWI) bombings, museums protected their collections by moving them to various locations. Many went into the damp London tunnels. After the war, the British Museum, lucky enough not to be bombed, reassembled the collection. After two years stored in high humidity, the objects were severely damaged with metal corrosion, mold and salt efflorescence. The Department of Scientific and Industrial Research (United Kingdom) (DSIR) hired Scottish Alexander Scott (chemist) (1853-1947), as director of scientific research in what became the British Research Laboratory in 1920. In 1922, conservator and archaeologist, Harold Plenderleith (1898-1997), became the first full time chemist affiliated with a museum laboratory. Together they started the first scientific conservation in the United Kingdom while studying the instability of the rapid deterioration. In 1934, Harold Plenderleith published “The Preservation of Antiquities” which contains vital information on the conservation preservation of metals and the Agents of Deterioration we know today. 

In the 1930s and 1940s, institutions in western Europe and the United States recognized the need for prevention of artifacts before repair and did extensive studies. Several large museums were adding research laboratories to their institutions. In 1931, the International Museums Office of the League of Nations, held their first conservation conference on scientific method applications in Rome. Foreshadowing the International Council of Museums (ICOM) in 1946 with its first general conference held in Paris in 1948. 

In preparation of WWII the museums again put the art into the underground tube tunnels but this time crates were stacked to allow air circulation. The British Museum commissioned a secret climate-controlled tunnel in Aberystwyth to store the artwork during the war. Moving and re-moving art and artifacts to stable and healthy environmental conditions permitted the deterioration to be minimal compared to WWI. Plenderleith who treated the artifacts after WWI, found no damage to the British Museum's collection when they returned from the controlled tunnel environment.

The United States preservation efforts, after the Pearl Harbor bombing, were unorganized and haphazard. Several museum directors believed in preservation conservation. George L. Stout, founder of the first conservation laboratory in the United States and one of the Monuments Men in Europe, was determined to create a standard of long-term preservation conservation. In 1949, his lecture for the American Association of Museums conference in Chicago, “Long-range Conservation” raised the question of “Why?” rather than “What? do we conserve. This began the spread of a collective consciousness. As a result, in 1950, the International Institute for Conservationof Historic and Artistic Works (IIC) was formed and Stout became its first president. In 1958, the ICC published an updated edition of H.J. Plenderlief's "The Conservation of Antiquities and Works of Art". One of the first systematic explanation of the mechanisms of deterioration including metals.

Late 1900s

In 1951, at the Sixth Session of United Nations Educational, Scientific and Cultural Organization (UNESCO) general conference, the Swiss government proposed establishment of a global institution to encourage research and awareness of conservation. In 1959, Plenderleith became the first director of the International Centre for the Study of Preservation and restoration of Cultural Property (ICCROM).

The collective mindset for conservation preservation changed the way museums and their directors address collections. Two other conservators of metallurgy are: 
 Robert M. Organ (1920-2011), a conservation scientist specializing in metals at the British Museum, whose work in metal deteripration especially in the areas of archaeological corroded bronze and silver are essential to the profession of modern conservation.
 Otto Nedbal, goldsmith and metal restorer and conservator, taught at the University of Vienna founding the first class in metal and enamel restoration in 1964.

2000's

As a result of the scientific research in well over the last 100 years, conservation has become more focused on: the preservation of a collection, the control of the environment and the agents of deterioration. ICOM -CC  Metals working group Conferences in 1995, 1998,2001 , 2004, 2007 ,2010,2013 ,2016 , and 2019  are all focused on metal conservation. These conferences have and will continue to shed light on metals deterioration. Providing information on the newest research innovations of preservation and conservation treatments of metals and the interactions with their surroundings. 

The last thirty plus years have also stressed minimalist conservation measures, but these methods of treatment can often come into conflict with visitor and sometimes researcher(s)' use of the object(s). The care of a collection is complex and an interdisciplinary approach of concessions and compromises taking in to account all the criteria is now needed with everyone's input.

See also
 Conservation and restoration of outdoor bronze artworks
 Conservation and restoration of copper-based objects
 Conservation and restoration of ferrous objects
 Conservation and restoration of glass objects
 Conservation and restoration of ivory objects
 Conservation and restoration of ceramic objects
 Conservation and restoration of silver objects

Further reading

Essential literature
 Corrosion and metal artifacts : a dialogue between conservators and archaeologists and corrosion scientists, Washington 1977.  (online)
 Conservation & restoration of metals : proceedings of the symposium held in Edinburgh, 30–31 March 1979., Edinburgh 1979.
 Stambolov, T. The corrosion and conservation of metallic antiquities and works of art - a preliminary survey, Amsterdam 1985.
 Corrosion inhibitors in conservation: The Proceedings of the conference held by UKIC in association with the Museum of London, London 1985.
 Pearson, C. Conservation of Marine Archaeological Objects, London 1987. 
 Conservation of metal statuary and architectural decoration in open-air exposure : symposium, Paris, 6. - 8. X. 1986 = Conservation des oeuvres d'art et décorations en métal exposées en plein air, Rome 1987.
 Townsend, J.H.; Child, R.E. Modern metals in museums, Cardiff 1988.
 Metals Conservation: 7th International Restorer Seminar, Veszprem, Veszprem 1989.
 Brown, B. ; Burnett, H. ; Chase, W. T. ; Goodway, M., Corrosion and metal artifacts : A dialogue between conservators and archaeologists and corrosion scientists, Houston  1991 
 METAL 95, Proceedings of International Conference on Metal Conservation, London 1997.
 METAL 98, Proceedings of International Conference on Metal Conservation, London 1999.
 METAL 01, Proceedings of International Conference on Metal Conservation, Perth 2002.
 METAL 04, Proceedings of International Conference on Metal Conservation, Canberra 2005. (online)
 METAL 07, Proceedings of International Conference on Metal Conservation, Amsterdam 2007.
 METAL 2010, Proceedings of International Conference on Metal Conservation, Charleston 2011.
 METAL 2013.Proceedings of Internationsl Conference on Metal Conservation,Edinburgh 2013.
 METAL 2016.Proceedings of International Conference on Metal Conservation, New Delhi 2017.
 METAL 2019.Proceedings of International Conference on Metal Conservation, Neuchatel 2019.
 Scott, D.A. Metallography and Microstructure of Ancient and Historic Metals, Santa Monica 1991. (online)
 Scott, D.A. Ancient and Historic Metals-Conservation and Scientific Research, Santa Monica 1994.(online)
 Scott, D.A. Copper and Bronze in Art-Corrosion, Colorants, Conservation, Los Angeles 2002.(online)
 Scott, D.A. Iron and Steel in Art-Corrosion, Colorants, Conservation, London 2009.
 Scott, D. A. Ancient Metals: Microstructure and Metallurgy Volume I, Los Angeles 2011.
 Scott, D. A. Gold and Platinum Metallurgy of Ancient Colombia and Ecuador.: Ancient Metals: Microstructure and Metallurgy Volume II,Los Angeles 2012.
 Scott, D. A. ANCIENT METALS: MICROSTRUCTURE ANDMETALLURGY Volume III CATALOGUE OF ANCIENT COLOMBIAN DATA.,Los Angeles 2012.
 Scott, D. A. Ancient Metals: Microstructure and Metallurgy Vol. IV: Iron and Steel.,Los Angeles 2013.
 Scott ,D.A.,Schwab,R. Metallography in Archaeology and Art,New York 2019.
 JAIN KAMAL K., NARAIN Shyam, Iron artifacts history, metallurgy, corrosion and conservation, Delhi, Agam Kala Prakashan, 2009, XXII-165 p.
 Selwyn, L. Metals and Corrosion-A Handbook for Conservation Professional, Ottawa 2004.
 Draymann-Weiser, T. Gilded Metals-History, Technology, Conservation, London 2000.
 Draymann-Weiser, T. Dialogue/89 - The conservation of bronze sculpture in the outdoor environment : a dialogue among conservators, curators, environmental scientists, and corrosion engineers, Houston 1992. 
 Dillman, P.; Beranger, G.; Piccardo, P.; Matthiesen, H. Corrosion of metallic heritage artefacts-Investigation, Conservation and Prediction of long term behaviour, Cambridge 2007.
 Cronyn, J.M. The Elements of Archaeological Conservation, London 1990.
 Turner-Walker,G. A Practical Guide to the Care and Conservation of Metals,Taipei 2008.
 Rodgers, B. The Archaeologist Manual for Conservation-A Guide to Non-toxic, Minimal Intervention Artifact Stabilization, New York 2004.
 Stuart, B. Analytical Techniques in Materials Conservation, Chichester 2007.
 May, E.; Jones, M. Conservation Science-Heritage Materials, Cambridge 2006.
 Untracht, O. Metal Techniques for Craftsmen, New York 1968.
 La Niece, S.; Craddock, P. Metal Plating and Patination: Cultural, Technical and Historical Developments, Boston 1993.
 Anheuser, K.; Werner, C. (Eds.) Medieval Reliquary Shrines and Precious Metalwork / Châsses-reliquaires et Orfèvrerie Médiévales, London 2006.
 Horie, C.V. Materials for Conservation, Oxford 2010.
 Smith, R.D. Make all sure : the conservation and restoration of arms and armour, Leeds 2006.
 Appelbaum, B. Conservation Treatment Methodology, New York 2007. 
 Practical Building Conservation!Metals and Glass, Farnham 2012.
 Dillmann, P., Watkinson, D., Angelini, E., Adriaens, A., (Ed.) Corrosion and conservation of cultural heritage metallic artefacts, Cambridge 2013.
 Risser,E.;Saunders,D. The  Restoration of Ancient  Bronzes - Naples and Beyond,Los Angeles 2013. (online)
 Ghoniem,M.A. Corrosion Inhibitors For Archaeological Copper - Conception, Mechanism and Testing,Saarbrücken 2012.
 Yu.J.;Lee.H.;Go.I. Conservation of metal objects,Daejeon 2012.
 Mitchell,D.S. Conservation of Architectural Ironwork ,London 2016.
 Costa,V. Modern Metals in Cultural Heritage - Understanding and Characterization,Los Angeles 2019.
 Aluminum: History, Technology and Conservation,Washington 2019.(online)
 Branch,L. Bronze Behaving Badly: Principles of Bronze Conservation,London 2020.
 Williams,A.;Dowen,K.(Eds.) Arms & Armour History, Conservation and Analysis, Essays in Honour of David Edge,London 2021.

Some important books on metal conservation in languages other than English
 Mourey, W. La conservation des antiquités métalliques, du chantier de fouilles au musée, Draguignan 1987.
 Stambolov, T.; Bleck, R.D.; Eichelmann, N. Korrosion und Konservierung von Kunst und Kulturgut aus Metall, Weimar I/1987. (online), II/1988. (online)
  Шемаханская, М.С. РЕСТАВРАЦИЯ МЕТАЛЛА. Методические рекомендации (1989), Moscow 1989.(online)
 Никитин, М.К., Мельникова,Е.П. ХИМИЯ В РЕСТАВРАЦИИ. СПРАВОЧНОЕ ПОСОБИЕ.; Leningrad 1990 (chapter on metals conservation) (online)
 Born, H. Restaurierung Antike Bronzewaffen, Mainz 1993.
 Heinrich, P. (Hrsg.) Metallrestaurierung, Munich 1994.
 Catello, C. Argenti antichi : tecnologia restauro conservazione : rifacimenti e falsificazioni, Naples 1994.
 Marabelli, M. Conservazione e restauro dei metalli d`arte, Rome 1995.
 Marabelli,M. Conservazione e restauro dei metalli d'arte. Vol. 2,Rome 2007.
 Krause, J. Sarkofagi cynowe : problematyka technologiczna warsztatowa i konserwatorska, Torun 1995.
 Dolcini, L. Il restauro delle oreficerie: aggiornamenti, Milan 1996.
 Mach, M. Metallrestaurierung/Metal Restoration, Munich 1997.(online)
 Fischer, A. Reste von organischen Materialien an Bodenfunden aus Metall – Identifizierung und Erhaltung für die archäologische Forschung, Munich 1997.
 Minzhulin, O.I. Restavraciya tvoriv z metalu, Kyiv 1998.
 Anheuser, K. Im Feuer Vergoldet, AdR-Schriftenreihe zur Restaurierung und Grabungstechnik, Band 4 / 1998.
 Mach, M.; Moetnner, P. Zinkguß, die Konservierung von Denkmälern aus Zink, Munich 1999.
 Barrandon, J.N.; Meyer-Roudet, H. A la recherche du métal perdu : nouvelles technologies dans la restauration des métaux archéologiques, Paris 1999.
 Meissner, B.; Doktor, A.; Mach, M. Bronze und Galvanoplastik-Geschichte-Materialanalyse-Restaurierung, Dresden 2000. (online)
 Volfovsky, C.; Philippon, J. La Conservation des metaux, Paris 2001.
 Brueggerhoff, S.; Koenigfeld, P. Farbige Eisengitter der Barockzeit: Beiträge zu Geschichte und Funktion, Korrosion und Konservierung, Bochum 2002.
 Melucca Vaccaro, A.; De Palma, G. I Bronzi di Riace : restauro come conoscenza : 1: archeologia, restauro, conservazione/vol.1, Roma 2003.
 Gaomez Moral, F.  Conservacion De Metales De Interes Cultural, Quito 2004.
 Letardi, P.; Trentin, I.; Cutugno, G. Monumenti in bronzo all'aperto. Esperienze di conservazione e confronto., Genova 2004.
 Ronald Gobiet (Ed.), Die Salzburger Mariensäule - Zur Konservierung monumentaler Bleiplastiken / Sulla conservazione dei monumenti in piombo, Salzburg 2006.
 Ferreira Da Silva,A.C;Menino Homem,P.(Eds.)Ligas Metalicas Investigacao e  Conservacao,Porto 2008.((online) 
 Catello, D Il restauro delle opere in argento. Restoration of silver artifacts, Naples 2008.
 Schlaepfer, B.R. Metais: Restauracao e conservacao, Rio de Janeiro 2009.
 Barrio, J.; Cano, E. (Editores). MetalEspaña ’08. Congreso de Conservación y Restauración del Patrimonio Metálico. UAM-CSIC, Madrid 2009.
 Krist, G. Metallrestaurierung-Metallkonservierung: Geschichte, Methode und Praxis, Vienna 2009.
 Safarzynski, S.; Weker, W.  Wprowadzenie do sztuki konserwacji metalu, Warsaw 2010.
 Schmidt-Ott, K. Das Plasma in der Metallkonservierung-Moeglichkeiten und Grenzen, Zurich 2010.(online)
 Bruecke, D. Die Konservierung pigmentierter Altbeschichtungen auf Stahlbauten, Saarbrücken 2011.
 Diaz Martinez, S.; Garcia Alonso, E. Tecnicas metodologicas applicadas a conservacion-restauracion del patrimonio metalico, Madrid 2011. (online)
 Barrio Martin, J.; Chamon Frenandez, J. Proyecto Dorados: tecnología, conservación y restauración de los metales dorados medievales, Madrid 2011.
 La técnica radiográafica en los metales históricos (English translation included), Madrid 2011. (online)
 Konzervování a restaurování kovů. Ochrana předmětů kulturního dědictví z kovů a jejich slitin, Brno 2011.
 Knaut, M.; Jeberien, A. (Hrsg.): Adel verpflichtet - Forschungen und Ergebnisse zur Konservierung und Restaurierung der barockzeitlichen Särge vom Schlossplatz Berlin-Mitte, Berlin 2012.
 Conservation of Metal Objects,National Research Institute of Cultural Heritage,Daejeon(S.Korea)2012. 
 Schmutzler, B. Rettung vor dem Rost, Rahden 2012.
 Landesamt f. Denkmalpfl. u. Archäologie Sachsen-Anhalt (Hrsg.):Die Merseburger Fürstengruft Geschichte, Zeremoniell, Restaurierung, Halle 2013.
 Kuhn, H.; Emerling, E. Werke aus Kupfer, Bronze und Messing, Muenchen 2014.
 Projecto Coremans :Criterios de intervención
en materiales metálicos/Intervention criteria for
metallic materials,Madrid 2015.(online)
 Actas del II Congreso de Conservación y Restauración del Patrimonio Metálico. MetalEspaña 2015
(online)
 Krack,E. Konservierungswissenschaft schreibt Geschichte Objektrestaurierung an der Angewandten – Ein Beitrag zur Entwicklungsgeschichte der Konservierungs - wissenschaft und Restaurierung,Wien 2012.
(online)
 Berger,D. Bronzezeitliche Färbetechniken an Metallobjekten nördlich der Alpen,Halle 2012.(online)
 Horev,V. Antikvarnoe oružie,ekspertiza i restavracija,Rostov on Don 2011.
 Аверин, А. В. «Реставрация древних металлических изделий», Moscow 2011.
 Цыбульская О.Н., Буравлёв И.Ю., Юдаков А.А., Никитин Ю.Г. Сохранение археологического металла. Владивоcток 2012.
 Jaschke,M.,Stähle,R.:Kostbare Einbandbeschläge an armenischen Handschriften,Wiesbaden 2015.
 Vančevska,D., Bozaroska Pavlovska,B. Konzervacija na metalni arheološki predmeti,Skopje 2013.
 Clerbois,S.  La conservation-restauration  des métaux archéologiques :des premiers soins à la conservation durable , Liege 2015.
 Шемаханская,М.С. Металлы и вещи.История. Свойства. Разрушение. Реставрация. Moscow 2015.
 Буршнева С.Г.  Реставрация археологических и этнографических предметов из железа,Kazan 2019.(online)
 Rossi,S. Il restauro delle oreficerie,Florence 2020.

Important older books and articles
Voss, A. Merkbuch, Altertümer auszugraben und auszibewahren. Eine Anleitung für das Verfahren bei Ausgrabungen, sowie zum Konserviren vor- und frühgeschicht Alterthümer. Greg. auf Veranlassung des Hrn. Ministers der geistl., Unterrichts- und Medizinal Angelegenbeiten. Berlin: Mittler und Sohn, 1888.
Rathgen, F. “Über eine neue Anwendung des elektrischen Stromes zur Konservierung antiker Bronzen.” Prometheus1 (1889): pp. 196–198.
Rathgen, F. “Über Konservierung antiker Bronzen.” Dingler's Polytechnisches Journal7 (1896): pp. 44–45.
Rathgen, F. “Über Reinigung oxydirter antiker Kupfermünzen.” Dingler's Polytechnisches Journal7 (1896): pp. 45–46.
Rathgen, F. “Zapon und seine Verwendung zur Konservierung von Sammlungsgegenständen (Hanschriften, Wachssiegel, Gipsabgüsse, Stein und Ton, Glas, Metall).” Prometheus15 (1903/1904): pp. 485–487, 499–502.
Rathgen, F.“Über die Erhalting von Altertumsfunden aus Metall.” P, Mainz, 1904.
Rhousopoloulos, O.A. “Über die Reinigung und Konservierung der Antiquitäten.” Chemische Zeitschrift2 (1903): pp. 202–204.
Berthelot, M. “Sur l'altération lente des objets de cuivre, au sein de la terre et dans les musées.” Comptes Rendus Hebdomadaires des Scéances de l'Académie des Sciences118 (Paris, 1894): pp. 768–770.
Berthelot, M. “Étude sur les métaux qui composent les objets de cuivre de bronze, d'étain, d'or et d'argent, découverts par M. DeMorgan, dans les fouilles de Dahchour, or provenant du Musée de Gizeh.” Annales de Chimie et de Physique, series 7, 4 (1895): pp. 546–574.
Berthelot, M. “Réaction des chlorures alcalins sur l'argent.” Annales de Chimie et de Physique, series 7, 14 (1898): pp. 205–206.
Berthelot, M. “Sur l'altération lente des alliages métalliques contenant du cuivre, au contact simultané de l'air et des chlorures alcalins.” Annales de Chimie et de Physique, series 7, 22 (1901): p. 457–460.
Applegren, H. “Krefting's Methode für Reinigung und Konservierung von Metalgegenständen.” Finska förnminnesföreningens Tidskrift17 (1897): pp. 333–347.
Frazer, W. “Ulcerative Disease of Bronze, or 'Bronze Cancroid.'.” Journal of the Royal Society of Antiquaries of Ireland8 (1898): pp. 61–62.
Setlick, B. “Über natürliche und künstlicheunstliche Patina, sowie Reinigung und Konservierung von Altertümern.” Chemiker-Zeitung 27 (1903): pp. 454–455.
Flinders Petrie, W. M.“The Treatment of Small Antiquities.” Archaeological Journal 65 (1888): pp. 85–89.
 Rathgen, F. Die Konservierung von Altertumsfunden, Berlin 1898 (chapter on metals conservation). (English edition online)
 Flinders Petrie, W.M. The Method and Aims in Archaeology, London 1904 (chapter on conservation) (online)
 Rosenberg, G. Antiquités en fer et en bronze : leur transformation dans la terre contenant de l'acide carbonique et des chlorures et leur conservation, Copenhagen 1917.
 Scott, A. The cleaning and restoration of museum exhibits (report upon investigation conducted at the British Museum, Department of Scientific and Industrial Research). London 1921.
 Scott, A. The cleaning and restoration of museum exhibits, 2d report. British Museum, Department of Scientific and Industrial Research. London 1923.
 Fink, C.G.; Eldridge, C.H. The restoration of ancient bronzes and other alloys, New York 1925.(  online)
 Galnbek, I.A. Ochistka i sokhranenie metallicheskikh predmetov drevnosti, Leningrad 1925 (first book dedicated to metals conservation/not only bronze and iron)
 Scott, A. The cleaning and restoration of museum exhibits, 3d report. British Museum, Department of Scientific and Industrial Research. London 1926.(Russian edition online)
 Nichols, H. W. Restoration of ancient bronzes and cure of malignant patina. Chicago 1930. (online)
 Lucas, A. Antiques: Their restoration and preservation. London 1932. (online)
 Plenderleith, H.J. The preservation of Antiquities, London 1934 (Chapter on metals conservation)
 Ocherki po metodike tehnologicheskog issledovaniya restavracii i konservacii drevnih metalicheskih izdeliy, Moscow 1935. (online)
 Farmakovskiy, M.V. Konservaciya i restavraciya muzeinih kollekciy, Moscow 1946 (chapter on metals conservation) (online)
 Plenderleith, H.J. The Conservation of Antiquities and Works of Art, London 1956 (chapter on metals conservation)
 France-Lanord, A.  La conservation des antiquites metalliques, Paris 1962.

Online magazines
  BROMEC Bulletin of Research on Metal Conservation

Metals conservation blogs
1. Armas protohistóricas con magnetita, by Jesús Alonso López

2.Conservation of metals - by Catia Viegas-Wesolowska

3. Staffordshire Hoard Blog

4. Cheapside Hoard Blog

Free software that can be used for metals conservation
 The Use of Expert Systems in Conservation
 The Modular Cleaning Program
 Download free conservators documentation software
  Freecorp-simple corrosion prediction software
 Online Cellular Automata-based corrosion simulation

See also
 Conservation and restoration of outdoor bronze artworks
 Conservation and restoration of copper-based objects
 Conservation and restoration of ferrous objects
 Conservation and restoration of glass objects
 Conservation and restoration of ivory objects
 Conservation and restoration of ceramic objects
 Conservation and restoration of silver objects

External links
ICOM-CC WG Metals  
Facebook  ICOM CC WG Metals  
Metals Conservation Discussion Group

References

Conservation and restoration of cultural heritage
Metalworking